Trinity Episcopal Church is a historic Episcopal church located in Mount Airy, Surry County, North Carolina. It was built in 1896, and is a one-story, Gothic Revival style masonry structure of uncoarsed granite rubble. The main block of the church measures 20 feet by 50 feet.  It has a small gable narthex and features lancet windows.  It is the oldest church building in Mount Airy.

It was added to the National Register of Historic Places in 1986. It is located in the Mount Airy Historic District.

References

Episcopal church buildings in North Carolina
Churches on the National Register of Historic Places in North Carolina
Gothic Revival church buildings in North Carolina
Churches completed in 1896
19th-century Episcopal church buildings
Buildings and structures in Surry County, North Carolina
National Register of Historic Places in Surry County, North Carolina
Historic district contributing properties in North Carolina
Mount Airy, North Carolina